Robert Humpsdon, D.D. was an Anglican bishop in the early seventeenth century.

An Englishman, he was Rector of Barton, Cheshire before coming over to Ireland. He was appointed  Bishop of Down and Connor in 1602 and served for four years, prior to his death in late 1606.

References

English bishops
17th-century Anglican bishops in Ireland
Bishops of Down and Connor
1606 deaths